Toad in the hole is a traditional English dish with sausage. 

It may also refer to 

 Toad in the hole (game), a coin-throwing pub game
 Another name for slosh (cue sport), a game played on a snooker table
 A name sometimes used for an entombed animal
 Another name for egg in the basket, an egg fried in a piece of bread

See also
 Towed in a Hole, a Laurel and Hardy film